Alain Moineau (15 May 1928 – 20 October 1986) was a French cyclist. He was born in Clichy, Hauts-de-Seine. He won a bronze medal in the team road race at the 1948 Summer Olympics in London, together with José Beyaert and Jacques Dupont.

References

1928 births
1986 deaths
Sportspeople from Clichy, Hauts-de-Seine
French male cyclists
Cyclists at the 1948 Summer Olympics
Olympic cyclists of France
Olympic bronze medalists for France
Olympic medalists in cycling
Medalists at the 1948 Summer Olympics
Cyclists from Île-de-France